Arthurs Lake is a rural locality in the local government area of Central Highlands in the Central region of Tasmania. The 2021 census recorded a population of 9 for Arthurs Lake.

History
Arthurs Lake is a confirmed suburb/locality.

Geography
Arthurs Lake (the body of water) is fully enclosed by the locality. The small localities of Flintstone and Morass Bay, on the shores of the lake, are fully enclosed by the locality of Arthurs Lake.

Road infrastructure
The B51 route (Poatina Road) enters from the south-west and exits to the west. Route C525 (Arthurs Lake Road) starts at an intersection with B51 near Flintstone and runs south and east through Wilburville to the Morass Bay Conservation Area.

References

Localities of Central Highlands Council
Towns in Tasmania